Moyencharia is a genus of moths belonging to the family of Cossidae, Metarbelidae.

Distribution
The known species of this genus are found in Africa.

Species
Moyencharia herhausi
Moyencharia joeli
Moyencharia mineti
Moyencharia ochreicosta
Moyencharia sommerlattei
Moyencharia winteri

References

 
Metarbelinae
Cossidae genera